The 1997 Hel van het Mergelland was the 25th edition of the Volta Limburg Classic cycle race and was held on 5 April 1997. The race started and finished in Eijsden. The race was won by Raymond Meijs.

General classification

References

1997
1997 in road cycling
1997 in Dutch sport